Radomír Chýlek (born 26 March 1967) is a retired Czech football midfielder.

References

1967 births
Living people
Czech footballers
FC Baník Ostrava players
FK Drnovice players
SSV Ulm 1846 players
FK Fotbal Třinec players
Association football midfielders
Czech expatriate footballers
Expatriate footballers in Germany
Czech expatriate sportspeople in Germany
Czech First League players
Czechoslovakia international footballers
People from Frýdek-Místek District
Sportspeople from the Moravian-Silesian Region